Stuart Alan Ransom Rose, Baron Rose of Monewden, Kt (born 17 March 1949) is a British businessman and life peer, who was the executive chairman of Marks & Spencer until 2010, remaining as chairman until early 2011. He was knighted in 2008 for his services to the retail industry and created a Conservative life peer on 17 September 2014, taking the title Baron Rose of Monewden, of Monewden in the County of Suffolk.

Rose was chairman of online retailer Ocado from 2013 to July 2020. He has been chairman of Asda since 2021.

In October 2015, he was appointed chair of Britain Stronger in Europe, the official remain campaign in the 2016 referendum on the United Kingdom's membership of the European Union.

Early life
Rose's grandparents were White Russian émigrés who fled to China after the 1917 revolution. Their son (later named Harry Ransom-Rose) was unofficially adopted by Nona Ransom, a Quaker from Bedford, England, who served as English tutor to (among others) Empress Wanrong (the last Empress of China), and Shunryu Suzuki (the Japanese monk who later established the first Zen monastery outside East Asia). 

Nona transported Stuart Rose's father, Harry, to safety in England as war loomed. The original family name was Bryantzeff, which Rose's father, ex-RAF and civil servant, changed. His mother's side is English, Scottish and Greek. 

The young family lived in a caravan in Warwickshire until Rose senior obtained a posting with the Imperial Civil Service in Tanganyika (now Tanzania). Rose went to the Roman Catholic St Joseph's Convent School in Dar es Salaam until he was 11. When he was 13 years old his family returned to England and his parents sent him to Bootham School, an independent Quaker boarding school in York. His first job was as an administration assistant at the BBC.

Career
Rose first joined Marks & Spencer in 1972, as a management trainee. Rose remained with Marks & Spencer until 1989, when he joined the Burton Group as Chief Executive in 1994. The Burton Group demerged, forming the Arcadia and Debenhams businesses.

In 1997, he joined Argos as Chief Executive, where he was charged with defending the company against a takeover bid from the home shopping giant, Great Universal Stores (GUS). Ultimately, GUS did succeed in taking control of Argos, although Rose was praised for negotiating an increased price for the retailer.

In a turbulent time in its history, Rose became the Chief Executive of Booker plc, where he oversaw the merger of the company with Iceland to form the Big Food Group.

Rose joined the Arcadia Group in 2000 as Chief Executive and left in 2002 following its acquisition. Rose turned around the fortunes of the Arcadia Group, and sold the group for over £800m, netting himself around £25m as part of the deal.

Rose received an Honorary Doctorate from Heriot-Watt University in 2007.

He was appointed to the position of Chief Executive of Marks & Spencer in May 2004 at the age of 56 and subsequently fought off takeover bids by Philip Green for the Group. For this role he was paid an annual salary of £1,130,000. In January 2007, he was named the "2006 Business Leader of the Year" by the World Leadership Forum for his efforts in restoring the fortunes of Marks & Spencer. He was knighted in the 2008 New Year Honours for services to the retail industry and to corporate social responsibility, and was appointed chairman of Business in the Community on 1 January 2008.

In 2008, Rose became executive chairman of Marks & Spencer. However, in the light of a recent profits warning, which sparked an unprecedented thirty per cent-plus plunge in the company's shares, this appointment caused some concern to many shareholders. Nevertheless, they voted to re-appoint him at their annual meeting on 9 July 2008. He stepped down as chief executive in May 2010, as executive chairman in July 2010, and as chairman in January 2011 following the appointment of Robert Swannell.

On 19 January 2011, Rose was appointed as a non-executive director of Woolworths Holdings Ltd, a large South African retail group listed on the Johannesburg Stock Exchange.

On 6 September 2012, Rose was appointed as non-executive chairman of Dressipi.com, an online personalised fashion service that matches clothes and accessories to a shopper's shape, style and individual preferences.

In 2013, Rose became an independent non-executive director and chairman of Ocado, the UK internet-only grocery retailer.

He was recruited to advise the government on turning around failing hospitals, asked to examine how to improve the organisational culture in under-performing hospitals and ways to recruit talent from inside and outside the NHS in February 2014.

In 2014, Rose was created a life peer and took a seat on the Conservative benches in the House of Lords. In October 2015, Rose was appointed chair of Britain Stronger in Europe, the official remain campaign in the 2016 referendum on the United Kingdom's membership of the European Union. After stating to a select committee in March 2016 that wages would go up should Britain leave the European Union, his public role was allegedly limited for the rest of the campaign. In 2019, Rose dismissed calls for a second referendum, stating that he 'believes in a democratic process', despite being a Remainer.

In 2015 Rose became Chairman of Time Out Market, owned by Time Out Group.

On 14 July 2020, Rose stepped down from his role as chairman of Ocado.

As of 2020 Rose chaired privately held businesses including Dressipi, an online fashion start-up, and Zenith, a vehicle-leasing and fleet management company.

On 21 January 2021, Rose was appointed non-executive chairman of EG Group.

On 23 November 2021, Rose was appointed chairman of Asda as its first dedicated chairman in more than 20 years.

Personal life
His mother, who had a history of depression, committed suicide at the age of 49 by taking an overdose combined with alcohol when Rose was 26 years old. 

Rose lives in Central London and Suffolk. He married Jennifer Cook in 1973 in Marylebone. They had one son and one daughter. After they separated, Rose lived with fashion writer Kate Reardon. Then, after separating from Reardon in 2009, and stepping down from his positions at M&S, Rose and Cook divorced in 2010.

On 16 July 2010, Rose was given an honorary Doctor of Laws (LL.D) from the University of Leeds, the same university from which his son graduated.

References

1949 births
British retail chief executives
People educated at Bootham School
English businesspeople in fashion
English businesspeople in retailing
English people of Greek descent
English chief executives
English people of Russian descent
English people of Scottish descent
Knights Bachelor
Living people
People from Gosport
Conservative Party (UK) life peers
Life peers created by Elizabeth II
People associated with Heriot-Watt University
People associated with the University of Leeds